Sopho Gelovani (born 21 March 1984) also known as Sophie Gelovani is a Georgian singer. She and Nodiko Tatishvili represented Georgia in the Eurovision Song Contest 2013 in Malmö, Sweden.

References

1984 births
Living people
21st-century women singers from Georgia (country)
Eurovision Song Contest entrants of 2013
Eurovision Song Contest entrants for Georgia (country)